The 2020–21 Liga de Balompié Mexicano season was the 1st professional season of the most important league of competitions organized by the Asociación Nacional del Balompié Mexicano, a Mexican football federation affiliated with CONIFA. The season began on 14 October 2020 and finished on 31 January 2021. Chapulineros de Oaxaca was the champion.

Teams

Stadiums and locations
{{Location map+ |Mexico |width=500|float=right |caption=Liga de Balompié Mexicano Official Teams |places=

Personnel and kits

Disaffiliated teams

On hiatus teams
On December 1, 2020, four franchises were placed on hiatus due to financial or administrative problems: Acaxees de Durango, Los Cabos, San José and Veracruzano Tiburón. These four clubs can rejoin in the following season as long as they manage to improve their financial situation.

On January 4, 2021, Atlético Capitalino abandoned the season due to problems derived from the COVID-19 pandemic that affect Mexico City.

Retired teams
On December 30, 2020, Halcones de Zapopan withdrew from the season due to financial problems, planning to come back next season as long as the league had adjustments in its structure and had better financial stability, however, on January 12, 2021 the team left the LBM due to lack of compliance with the league board and announced their goal of seeking to join another competition.

Regular season

Standings

Positions by Round

Results 

Notes

Liguilla 
On January 5, 2021, the LBM announced the end of the regular season due to the small number of teams that continued to participate. It was determined that the best team of the season would qualify directly to the semifinals, while the teams placed between second and seventh place will have to play a so-called triangular preliminary round. The triangular and semifinal phases will be played as a single game, while the final will be played in two games.

Triangular

|}

Final stage

Semi-finals

|}

Final

First leg

Second leg

Regular season statistics

Top goalscorers 
Players sorted first by goals scored, then by last name.

Notes

See also 
Liga de Balompié Mexicano

References

External links
 Official website of LBM 

Liga de Balompié Mexicano
1